Óscar Alfaro (7 January 1904 – 14 October 1939) was a Chilean footballer. He competed in the men's tournament at the 1928 Summer Olympics.

References

External links
 
 

1904 births
1939 deaths
Chilean footballers
Chile international footballers
Olympic footballers of Chile
Footballers at the 1928 Summer Olympics
People from Quillota
Association football midfielders
Santiago Wanderers footballers
San Luis de Quillota footballers